The Inseparables is a 1929 British silent romance film directed by Adelqui Migliar and  John Stafford and starring Elissa Landi, Patrick Aherne and Annette Benson. It was filmed at the Whitehall Studios at Elstree.

Plot
A smuggler falls in love with a gypsy girl he meets, but she seems to prefer his companion.

Cast
 Elissa Landi as Velda 
 Patrick Aherne as Laurie Weston 
 Annette Benson as Adrienne 
 Jerrold Robertshaw as Sir Reginald Farleigh 
 Gabriel Gabrio as Pietro 
 Fred Rains as Alexander Figg

References

Bibliography
 Low, Rachel. The History of British Film: Volume IV, 1918–1929. Routledge, 1997.

External links

1929 films
British romance films
British silent feature films
1920s romance films
Films shot at Station Road Studios, Elstree
Films directed by Adelqui Migliar
British black-and-white films
1920s English-language films
1920s British films
English-language romance films